Flour kurabiye (Turkish: Un kurabiyesi) is a kind of Turkish cookie that is made from butter, sunflower oil (or another mild flavored oil), baking powder, and the namesake ingredient flour. Generally, vanilla powder (commonly used as a substitute for vanilla extract in Turkish baked goods) is also added. Flour kurabiye is a variant of kurabiye.

See also
Acıbadem kurabiyesi
Osmania Biscuit

References

http://www.giverecipe.com/the-feast-of-sacrifice-and-flour-cookies.html

Turkish pastries
Cookies

Shortbread